Illinois State Fairgrounds Racetrack is a one mile long clay oval motor racetrack on the Illinois State Fairgrounds in Springfield, the state capital. It is frequently nicknamed The Springfield Mile. Constructed in the late 19th century and reconstructed in 1927, the track has hosted competitive auto racing since 1910, making it one of the oldest speedways in the United States. The original mile track utilized the current frontstretch and the other side was behind the current grandstands and the straightaways were connected by tight turns. It is the oldest track to continually host national championship dirt track racing, holding its first national championship race in 1934 under the American Automobile Association banner.  It is the home of five world records for automobile racing, making it one of the fastest dirt tracks in the world. Since 1993, the venue is managed by Bob Sargent's Track Enterprises.

The Illinois State Fair mile currently hosts the Allen Crowe Memorial 100 ARCA stock car race, USAC Silver Crown championship dirt cars, UMP Late Models and Modifieds and the A.M.A. Grand National Championship. The only driver who has won races in three disciplines of racing in Ken Schrader who won in ARCA cars (1998), UMP Modifieds (1998), and midgets.

Billy Winn won the first national championship dirt track race held at the Illinois State Fairgrounds in 1934.  A.J. Foyt ran his first national championship race there in August 1957.  The track is host to two of the older memorial events in the United States, the Bettenhausen 100 for the USAC dirt championship cars, first run in 1961 and the Allen Crowe Memorial 100 stock car event for USAC, now ARCA, stock cars, first held in 1963.  Both races are now held on the last weekend of the Illinois State Fair.  Chuck Gurney is the only seven-time winner of the Bettenhausen 100, while ARCA driver Frank Kimmel won the Allen Crowe Memorial for the seventh time in 2008.

The Bettenhausen 100 was part of the AAA/USAC Championship Car schedule from 1934 to 1940, 1947 to 1970 and again in 1981 and 1982, and has been a Silver Crown]championship race since then.

From 1946 to 1953, the A.M.A. Grand National Champion was crowned based solely on the results of the Springfield Mile held at the fairground racetrack. The 2020 Silver Crown race was delayed until October 18 by the COVID-19 pandemic; it was the latest that a race has been held at the track in a year and became the series' finale of the season.  The 2022 Silver Crown race was also postponed to October, this time by rain.

AAA/USAC Champ Car/Silver Crown race history
All winners were  American

See also
 List of auto racing tracks in the United States

References

External links
Illinois State Fair Racetrack Official Site
Illinois State Fairgrounds archive at Racing-Reference

Motorsport venues in Illinois
ARCA Menards Series tracks
NASCAR tracks
National Register of Historic Places in Springfield, Illinois
Sports venues in Springfield, Illinois
Tourist attractions in Springfield, Illinois
Historic districts on the National Register of Historic Places in Illinois
Sports venues on the National Register of Historic Places in Illinois
Sports venues completed in 1853
1853 establishments in Illinois
Illinois State Fair